Iowa Highway 141 (Iowa 141) is an east–west highway in the western and central portions of the state.  It is the most direct link between Sioux City and Des Moines.  It also serves as a freeway link between Des Moines and the outlying communities of Perry, Granger, and Grimes. Iowa 141's begins near Sloan at an interchange with Interstate 29 (I-29) at ends at another interchange with I-35 / I-80 on the edge of the Des Moines suburbs of Urbandale and Grimes.

Route description
Iowa 141 begins at I-29 just west of Sloan.  It goes east through Sloan and Hornick before meeting Iowa 31 in Smithland.  It then turns southeast and at Mapleton meets Iowa 175, with which it forms a wrong-way concurrency, as eastbound Iowa 141 goes the same direction as westbound Iowa 175.  They separate and Iowa 141 continues southeast before going south into Ute, where it meets Iowa 183.  At Ute, it turns east and passes through Charter Oak before meeting U.S. Highway 59 (US 59) northwest of Denison.  While in Denison, it meets Iowa 39 and has another wrong-way concurrency with westbound US 30.  South of Denison, US 59 and Iowa 141 separate.

Iowa 141 turns east and passes through Aspinwall and Manning before meeting US 71 south of Templeton. Iowa 141 and US 71 run concurrently for  before separating west of Dedham. It continues east, bypasses Dedham and turns southeast briefly before going east to go through Coon Rapids  After another brief southeasterly turn, it goes east and passes through Bayard, where it meets Iowa 25. After passing through Bagley, Iowa 141 meets Iowa 4, with which it briefly runs concurrent. After passing south of Jamaica and Dawson, it meets Iowa 144 in Perry and the highway turns into an expressway, which it will be for the rest of its length.

After passing through Perry, Iowa 141 continues east and meets US 169 near Bouton.  Near Woodward, it meets Iowa 210 and turns southeast to go towards the Des Moines area.  At Granger, it meets Iowa 17 and shortly thereafter meets Iowa 415, where it then turns south.  It then passes through Grimes and meets Iowa 44.  It then enters Urbandale and quickly ends at an interchange with I-35 / I-80.

History
Iowa 141 originally ran from Sioux City to Denison but was extended to the Des Moines area in 1941.  In 1961, the highway was realigned so that it no longer entered Sioux City.  The new segment went west from Smithland to Sloan, while the original segment from Smithland to Sioux City was designated as Iowa 982. Between 1975 and 1977, Iowa 141 was upgraded to a freeway between Perry and I-35 / I-80.

Major intersections

External links

Iowa Highways Page: Highway 141.
End of Iowa 141 at Iowa Highway Ends.

References

141
Transportation in Woodbury County, Iowa
Transportation in Monona County, Iowa
Transportation in Crawford County, Iowa
Transportation in Carroll County, Iowa
Transportation in Guthrie County, Iowa
Transportation in Dallas County, Iowa
Transportation in Polk County, Iowa